Liam Foudy (born February 4, 2000) is a Canadian professional ice hockey centre for the  Columbus Blue Jackets of the National Hockey League (NHL). He was drafted 18th overall by the Blue Jackets in the 2018 NHL Entry Draft.

Playing career

Junior hockey

London Knights
Foudy was selected 18th overall in the 2016 OHL Priority Selection by the London Knights.

Foudy made his OHL debut on September 21, 2016, as he had no points in a 4–1 loss to the Sarnia Sting. In his next game two days later, Foudy earned his first career OHL point, an assist, in a 6–2 victory over the Erie Otters. On November 12, Foudy recorded his first career OHL goal, as he scored against Liam Herbst of the Guelph Storm in a 4–1 win. On February 26, 2017, Foudy recorded the first multi-point game of his OHL career, as he scored a goal and an assist in an 8–1 win over the Guelph Storm. Overall, Foudy finished the 2016–17 season with nine goals and 15 points in 58 games for the Knights. On March 24, 2017, Foudy appeared in his first career OHL playoff game, as he had no points in a 4–3 overtime loss to the Windsor Spitfires. In thirteen post-season games, Foudy did not record a point.

In his second season with the Knights in 2017–18, Foudy saw an increase in his offensive production. On January 5, 2018, Foudy recorded his first career multi-goal game, scoring twice against Jake McGrath of the Sudbury Wolves in a 5–1 victory. Overall, in 65 games during the season, Foudy scored 24 goals and 40 points. On March 22, 2018, Foudy earned his first career OHL playoff point, an assist, in a 5–4 loss to the Owen Sound Attack. One week later, Foudy scored his first career OHL playoff goal, scoring against Olivier Lafreniere of the Attack, in a 2–1 loss. In four post-season games, Foudy scored a goal and two points.

Foudy returned to London after being reassigned to the Knights following training camp with the Columbus Blue Jackets for the 2018–19 season. On November 23, 2018, Foudy recorded his first career three point game in the OHL, as he scored a goal and two assists in a 7–2 win over the Owen Sound Attack. In his next game two days later, Foudy scored two goals and an assist in a 4–2 win over the Windsor Spitfires for back-to-back three point games. Later in the season, on January 25, Foudy recorded his first career four point game, as he scored a goal and three assists in a 7–0 win over the Windsor Spitfires. In 62 games during the regular season, Foudy scored 36 goals and 68 points. On March 26, 2019, Foudy recorded his first multi-point game in the post-season, scoring a goal and an assist in a 6–3 win over the Windsor Spitfires. In 11 post-season games, Foudy scored six goals and 12 points.

Foudy joined the Knights for a fourth season in 2019–20 after being reassigned to the team by the Columbus Blue Jackets. On November 21, Foudy recorded his second career four point game, as he scored two goals and two assists in a 5–2 win over the Mississauga Steelheads. Foudy concluded the season on a career high 18 game point streak, as he scored 13 goals and 34 points during this streak. In 45 games, Foudy scored 28 goals and tied his career high with 68 points.

Professional career

Columbus Blue Jackets
After two seasons with the Knights, Foudy was drafted 18th overall by the Columbus Blue Jackets in the 2018 NHL Entry Draft.

On July 30, 2018, Foudy was signed to a three-year, entry-level contract with the Columbus Blue Jackets.

Following the completion of his season with the London Knights of the Ontario Hockey League, the Blue Jackets assigned Foudy to their American Hockey League affiliate, the Cleveland Monsters, for the 2019 Calder Cup playoffs. On April 19, 2019, Foudy appeared in his first career professional hockey game, as he was held to no points in a 5–3 win over the Syracuse Crunch. On April 25, Foudy scored his first career professional goal, against Edward Pasquale of the Syracuse Crunch. Foudy scored a second goal in the game, as he helped the Monsters defeat the Crunch 3–0. In eight playoff games with Cleveland, Foudy scored two goals.

Foudy played in his NHL debut against the Tampa Bay Lightning on February 10, 2020, as he recalled by the Blue Jackets on an emergency basis. He was held off the score sheet in his first game. In his second game, Foudy earned an assist on a goal scored by Boone Jenner in a 4–3 loss to the Buffalo Sabres on February 13.

Foudy scored his first career NHL goal in Game 5 of the Qualifying Round of the 2020 Stanley Cup playoffs in a 3–0 victory against the Toronto Maple Leafs.

International play

 

Foudy was selected to represent Team Canada at the 2018 IIHF World U18 Championships.

Personal life
Foudy's parents were both athletes: his mother France Gareau was an Olympic sprinter who won a silver medal at the 1984 Summer Olympics and his father Sean Foudy played in the Canadian Football League for the Ottawa Rough Riders and BC Lions from 1989 to 1994. His brother, Jean-Luc was drafted by the Colorado Avalanche in the third round, 75th overall, of the 2020 NHL Entry Draft.

Career statistics

Regular season and playoffs

International

References

External links
 

2000 births
Living people
Canadian ice hockey centres
Cleveland Monsters players
Columbus Blue Jackets draft picks
Columbus Blue Jackets players
London Knights players
National Hockey League first-round draft picks
Ice hockey people from Toronto